The 1985–86 Virginia Cavaliers men's basketball team represented the University of Virginia and was a member of the Atlantic Coast Conference during the 1985–86 NCAA Division I men's basketball season. The Cavaliers were led by head coach Terry Holland and played their home games at University Hall in Charlottesville, Virginia.

Roster

Schedule and results 

|-
!colspan=9 style=| Regular season

|-
!colspan=9 style=| ACC Tournament

|-
!colspan=9 style=| NCAA Tournament

Rankings

References

Virginia Cavaliers men's basketball seasons
Virginia
Virginia
Virgin
Virgin